Freud is a tiny lunar impact crater that lies on a plateau within the Oceanus Procellarum, in the northwest part of the Moon's near side. It is located a few kilometers to the west of the Vallis Schröteri, a large, sinuous valley that begins to the north of the crater Herodotus, then meanders north, then northwest, and finally southwest, until it reaches the edge of the lunar mare.

References

 
 
 
 
 
 
 
 
 
 
 
 

Impact craters on the Moon